Orthodox calendar  may refer to:
 Eastern Orthodox Church liturgical calendar
 Revised Julian calendar, used by some Eastern Orthodox for the calculation of fixed feasts
 Julian calendar, used by some Eastern Orthodox for the calculation of fixed feasts
 The OC wall calendar, an LGBT-themed photo wall calendar

See also 

 Orthodox Church (disambiguation)